The Tennessee Tech Golden Eagles men's basketball team is the men's basketball team that represents Tennessee Tech in Cookeville, Tennessee, United States. The school's team currently competes in the Ohio Valley Conference.

Postseason results

NCAA Division I Tournament results
The Golden Eagles have appeared in three NCAA Tournaments. Their combined record is 0–2. They have not reached the Tournament in sixty years, the third longest in NCAA Division I Tournament history.

NIT results
The Golden Eagles have appeared in two National Invitation Tournaments (NIT). Their combined record is 3–2.

CIT results
The Golden Eagles have appeared in two CollegeInsider.com Postseason Tournaments (CIT). Their combined record is 0–2.

Vegas 16 results
The Golden Eagles have appeared in one Vegas 16. Their record is 0–1.

Players

Retired jerseys
Tennessee Tech has retired four jerseys in program history.

Professional players
Anthony Fisher (born 1986), basketball player in the Israeli Basketball Premier League

References

External links
Team website